Turnê Show das Poderosas is the first tour of the Brazilian singer Anitta. The tour began on June 6, 2013, in Rio de Janeiro, Brazil. At the premiere of the first tour was in Barra da Tijuca in Rio. The tour dates happened in nightclubs and parties in Brazil.

Anitta confessed to the press that the "Show das Poderosas Tour"

About the tour

The mission of those who do not want to miss the biggest production of the powerful National Pop was not easy. Besides spending more than 2 hours in traffic to get to the site, enter the house was also a challenge: Before 2:00 am that Friday, the venue Music bar was already crowded with an audience of over 6,500 people. Backstage at the show, do not speak of anything else, everyone commented on the success of public and lack of organization in traffic around the bar Music. In addition to the tickets offered for sale, the staff of the artist received many requests for invitations to the show that failed to meet everyone. Among the privileged were much of the Rio press, many global Wolf Maya came to the cabin of the artist with his class a few minutes after starting the show and many other celebrities were honoring the artist. While DJs warmed the public, a friendly and spontaneous artist received journalists, guests, fans and friends in the backstage the show and shared details of his new tour, which has two formats show. Besides the overproduction of Show das Poderosas Tour, The Club Anitta, with reduced staff and structure to meet public spaces and smaller.

Setlist

Shows

References 

Anitta (singer) concert tours
2013 concert tours
2014 concert tours